Chris McKendry (born Christine McKendry February 18, 1968) is a journalist for ESPN, a role she has served since 1996. She was co-anchor of the 11-1pm ET weekday block of live ESPN SportsCenter shows, alongside Jay Crawford. As of April 1, 2016, she serves as full-time on-site host for ESPN tennis coverage of the Australian Open, Wimbledon and US Open.

Early life 
McKendry grew up in the Philadelphia, Pennsylvania, area, and was a Division I scholarship tennis player at Drexel University.

Career
Prior to joining ESPN, McKendry had been at WJLA-TV, ABC affiliate in Washington D.C., where she was a sports reporter.

McKendry first anchored SportsCenter on July 27, 1996, shifting to ESPNEWS for the launch of the 24-hour sports news network.  She returned to SportsCenter later that year, co-hosting the weekend morning and weekday 6 p.m. editions of the network’s flagship news and information program.

McKendry’s work beyond SportsCenter has included a variety of assignments, including late night host of ESPN’s Wimbledon coverage in 2007 and covering the U.S. Open for SportsCenter in 2002-06. She has also served as co-host of ESPN’s coverage of the Winter X Games late-night host for the X Games in 1997 and 1998, and contributed to College Football Live during the 2007 season. She was the sideline reporter for ESPN, ESPN2 and ABC Sports’ telecasts of the 1999 FIFA Women’s World Cup, and since 2002 has hosted the ESPN’s coverage of the National Spelling Bee. McKendry also served as a columnist on ESPN.com’s “Page Two” In 2001 and 2002.

McKendry has the distinction as being the first woman to work as a television sports news anchor in the Washington D.C. market (1994–96). In June 1996, she received a regional Sports Emmy in the Best Sports Segment Category for “NFL 101,” which illustrated for novice fans how to watch football.  While at WJLA-TV, McKendry also co-hosted Redskin Magazine, a 1-hour, live pregame show.  In 1996, she was sideline and feature reporter for TNT and TBS during the NBA Playoffs.

She also served as a sports anchor/reporter at All-News Channel/Conus in Minneapolis (1993–1994), an update anchor for USA Network (1993–1994) and Newsport (1994) and as a producer for Fox News Service in Washington D.C. (1992–1993).

McKendry co-anchored her final SportsCenter broadcast on March 31, 2016 and transitioned to cover tennis full-time for ESPN with the Australian Open in January, and U.S. Open in late summer.

Personal life
McKendry graduated from Archbishop Ryan High School and later attended Drexel University on a tennis scholarship. From Somerton, Philadelphia, she is currently married and the mother of two sons.

References

External links
Chris McKendry article archive
Chris McKendry Page 2 article
Chris McKendry ESPN Bio

1968 births
Living people
American television sports anchors
Television personalities from Philadelphia
Drexel Dragons women's tennis players
Drexel University alumni
Tennis commentators
Television anchors from Washington, D.C.
Women sports announcers
Scripps National Spelling Bee
National Basketball Association broadcasters
American soccer commentators
American women columnists
Washington Redskins announcers
College football announcers
ESPN people